The Holy Family of Nazareth Church is a Roman Catholic church in the Koskela district in Oulu.

The church building, designed by architect Gabriel Geronzi, was constructed in two phases. Pope John Paul II blessed the cornerstone of the church on his visit to Finland in 1989. The first phase of the church building was completed in 1991. The second phase was completed in 2000.

The parish of the Holy Family of Nazareth was established in 1992. It includes Northern Ostrobothnia and the Finnish Lapland and is the northernmost catholic parish of Finland.

Operating in the parish since 1989,  there are four neocatechumenal communities in the parish.

References

External links 

Churches in Oulu
Roman Catholic churches completed in 1991
Catholic Church in Finland
1991 establishments in Finland
Neocatechumenal Way
20th-century Roman Catholic church buildings in Finland